South Tipperary was a UK Parliament constituency in Ireland, returning one Member of Parliament 1885–1922.

Prior to 1885 the area was part of the Tipperary. From 1922, on the establishment of the Irish Free State, it was not represented in the UK Parliament.

Boundaries
This constituency comprised the southern part of County Tipperary. The seat was defined under the Redistribution of Seats Act 1885 as comprising the baronies of Clanwilliam, and Iffa and Offa West. The seat was unchanged under the Redistribution of Seats (Ireland) Act 1918.

Members of Parliament

Elections

Elections in the 1880s

Elections in the 1890s

Elections in the 1900s

Elections in the 1910s

Sources

The Parliaments of England by Henry Stooks Smith (1st edition published in three volumes 1844–50), 2nd edition edited (in one volume) by F.W.S. Craig (Political Reference Publications 1973)

References

Westminster constituencies in County Tipperary (historic)
Dáil constituencies in the Republic of Ireland (historic)
Constituencies of the Parliament of the United Kingdom established in 1885
Constituencies of the Parliament of the United Kingdom disestablished in 1922